50 Rockefeller Plaza (formerly the Associated Press Building) is a 15-story building located at Rockefeller Plaza between 50th and 51st Streets in Midtown Manhattan, New York City. Completed in 1938, the building is part of Rockefeller Center, which was built in the Art Deco style.

History

Rockefeller Center occupies three blocks in Midtown Manhattan bounded by Fifth and Sixth Avenues to the east and west, between 48th Street to the south and 51st Street to the north. By 1936, most of the complex had been completed. Rockefeller Center Inc. only needed to develop three empty plots in the middle of the complex's northern and southern blocks.

Rockefeller Center's executives went into talks with the Associated Press for a building on the northern empty lot, which was occupied by the complex's truck delivery ramp. The lot had been reserved for the Metropolitan Opera house, but the managers could not wait to develop the lot anymore, so in 1937, the opera plans were formally scrapped. The lot had also been planned as a hotel site, but this was also deemed economically infeasible. In January 1938, Associated Press agreed to rent the fourth through seventh floors of the structure, with the building to be named for the company.

Construction of the steelwork started in April 1938, and after 29 working days, it was topped out by June. The Associated Press moved into the structure in December. The building, located at 50 Rockefeller Plaza, was built to the outer limits of its lot without any setbacks or rooftop gardens; it rose only 15 floors because of the 1916 zoning law and the paucity of other tenants. The presence of Associated Press and Time Inc. expanded Rockefeller Center's scope from strictly a radio-communications complex to a hub of both radio and print media. In 1938, the Associated Press opened the Guild, a newsreel theater, along the curve of the truck ramp below the building.

In the late 2010s and early 2020s, Studio Mellone renovated the lobby of 50 Rockefeller Plaza. The lobby received black-terrazzo floors with brass detail; several pieces of artwork; curved limestone walls; and bronzed-steel urns.

Description

50 Rockefeller Plaza is located on the west side of Rockefeller Plaza between 50th and 51st Streets. The only building in the Center built to the outer limits of its lot line, the 15-story building took its shape from Associated Press's need for a single, undivided, loft-like newsroom as large as the lot could accommodate—namely, a  blocky structure with no setbacks. At one point,  of transmission wire were embedded in conduits on the building's fourth floor. The complex's truck ramp descends under the building from 50th Street, while the rear of the building is located next to the  Radio City Music Hall. The building also contained the Guild Theater, a 450-seat newsreel theater, from 1938 to 1999.

Isamu Noguchi's  stainless steel panel, News, is located above the building's entrance. His work, which depicts the various forms of communications used by journalists in the 1930s, honors the different occupations in the news industry. It is one of Noguchi's last abstract works as well as the only stainless steel work he ever commissioned.

References

Sources

External links

Rockefeller Center
Art Deco architecture in Manhattan
1938 establishments in New York City
Office buildings completed in 1938